Juan Sempere y Guarinos (1754–1830) was a Spanish politician, jurist, bibliographer, economist and writer.

People from Elda
Writers from the Valencian Community
18th-century Spanish lawyers
Afrancesados
1754 births
1830 deaths